Walnut Township is one of ten townships in Adair County, Missouri, United States. At the 2010 census, its population was 257. Walnut Township was named from the old-growth forests of walnut it contained at the time of settlement.

Geography
It contains two cemeteries: Cheeseman and Hall.

The streams of Little Mussel Creek and Little Walnut Creek run through this township.

References

 USGS Geographic Names Information System (GNIS)

External links
 US-Counties.com
 City-Data.com

Townships in Adair County, Missouri
Kirksville micropolitan area, Missouri
Townships in Missouri